Kampong Manggis is a village in Brunei-Muara District, Brunei, as well as a neighbourhood in the capital Bandar Seri Begawan. The population was 4,229 in 2016. It is one of the villages within Mukim Berakas 'B'. The postcode is BC3615.

Administration 
Apart from being a village subdivision, Kampong Manggis has also been subsumed under the municipal area of the capital Bandar Seri Begawan.

Facilities 
Suri Seri Begawan Raja Pengiran Anak Damit Mosque is the village mosque for Kampong Manggis and the neighbouring Kampong Madang. It was inaugurated by Sultan Hassanal Bolkiah in 2014. The mosque can accommodate 2,400 worshippers.

References 

Villages in Brunei-Muara District
Neighbourhoods in Bandar Seri Begawan